Sacha Emanoel Nacht (23 September 1901 – 20 March 1977) was a Romanian-born French psychiatrist and psychoanalyst.

Works
 Le masochisme, 1938
 De la pratique à la théorie psychanalytique, 1950
 (ed.) La psychanalyse d'aujourd'hui, 1956. Translated as Psychoanalysis of today, 1959. Translated in Spanish as: El psicoanálisis, hoy
 La présence du psychanalyste, 1963
 Guérir avec Freud, 1971

References

1901 births
1977 deaths
French people of Romanian-Jewish descent
French psychiatrists
French psychoanalysts
Jewish psychoanalysts
Analysands of Sigmund Freud
20th-century French physicians